Brain acid soluble protein 1 is a protein that in humans is encoded by the BASP1 gene.

This gene encodes a membrane bound protein with several transient phosphorylation sites and PEST motifs. Conservation of proteins with PEST sequences among different species supports their functional significance. PEST sequences typically occur in proteins with high turnover rates. Immunological characteristics of this protein are species specific. This protein also undergoes N-terminal myristoylation.

References

External links

Further reading